Ćirjak Račanin (probably the area of Bajina Bašta, Serbia c. 1660 – Szentendre, Hungary 1731) was a Serbian writer and monk.

There was as much of the moralist as of the wit in Ćirjak Račanin, and that side found its purest expression in devotional texts, which he is said to have not only ornately decorated and illuminated but composed during long nights of guard duty in the tower of the fortified Rača monastery. The Turks several times carried out reprisals against the monks for engaging in educational activities and promoting Serbian culture (copying ancient church manuscripts and writing books and disseminating them). Eventually, the monks were forced to take their archive with them and with their spiritual leader, Arsenije III Čarnojević, went to join the Christian forces in the Battle of Zenta in northern Serbia. At the time Serbia, with the help of Austria, harbored hope to rid itself of the Ottoman yoke. Two of Serbia's greatest sons, Đorđe Branković, Count of Podgorica, and Jovan Monasterlija were gathering volunteers for the ultimate confrontation. Ćirjak Račanin, like his fellow monks, joined the insurgents, led by Monasterlija, who was under the supreme commander of the Austrian crown.

After the defeat of the Ottoman army, Ćirjak Račanin left the Austrian army to give his full attention to Serbian politics and his writing career.

Work
An Anthology (Zbornik) of the Rača monastery from 1649, now located at the Belgrade University Library in Belgrade, contains a short history of the Serbian people from the time of King Stefan Milutin, mid-13th century until the middle of the 17th century when it was written. The writer of this book was attributed to Ćirjak Račanin.

See also
 Račanin, disambiguation page
Gavrilo Stefanović Venclović
Kiprijan Račanin (1650–1730), Serbian Orthodox monk and writer
Jerotej Račanin (1650–1727), Serbian Orthodox monk and writer
Teodor Račanin (1500–1560), Serbian Orthodox monk and writer
Simeon Račanin ( 1676–1700), Serbian Orthodox monk and writer
Hristifor Račanin (1595–1670), Serbian Orthodox monk and writer
Prohor Račanin, Serbian Orthodox monk
Grigorije Račanin ( 1739), Serbian writer
Jefrem Janković Tetovac

References

Sources
 
 Jovan Skerlić, Istorija nove srpske književnosti (Belgrade, 1914, 1921) pages 26–28.

17th-century Serbian people
Serbian monks
Serbian male writers
People from Bajina Bašta
1660s births
1731 deaths
Habsburg Serbs
18th-century Serbian people
Serbian Orthodox clergy
Refugees of the Great Turkish War